Kurd Peters (7 August 1914 – 24 July 1957) was a German officer (Major) in the Luftwaffe during World War II, and a recipient of the Knight's Cross of the Iron Cross of Nazi Germany. He was credited with four aerial victories in Defense of the Reich actions.

In November 1943. Peters was appointed Gruppenkommandeur (group commander) of II. Gruppe of Jagdgeschwader 300 (JG 300—300th Fighter Wing). On 21 June 1944, Peters claimed three aerial victories. His first two claims of the day were in fact Herausschüsse (separation shots)—a severely damaged heavy bomber forced to separate from its combat box which was counted as an aerial victory. A Consolidated B-24 Liberator bomber was forced from its combat box southeast of Berlin at 10:07. At 10:20, he shot down a B-24 bomber near Adlershof. On 29 June, Peters was shot down in his Focke Wulf Fw 190 A-7 (Werknummer 340303—factory number) near Laucha an der Unstrut and Naumburg. He baled out and was wounded. Command of II. Gruppe was then transferred to Major Alfred Lindenberger.

Awards and decorations

 Honour Goblet of the Luftwaffe (5 October 1942)
 German Cross in Gold on 20 October 1942 as Hauptmann in the 1.(Fern)/Aufklärungsgruppe 22
 Knight's Cross of the Iron Cross on 29 October 1944 as Major and Gruppenkommandeur of the II.(Sturm)/Jagdgeschwader 300

Notes

References

Citations

Bibliography

 
 
 
 
 

1914 births
1957 deaths
Military personnel from Braunschweig
German World War II pilots
Recipients of the Gold German Cross
Recipients of the Knight's Cross of the Iron Cross
German Air Force personnel